Sarson ka saag is a dish of mustard greens cooked with spices. It originated
in the north of the Indian subcontinent and is popular throughout the region.

Name
The dish is known as Sarson da saag in Punjabi and Sareyan Da Saag in Dogri. 

Sarson and Sareyan derive from the Sanskrit word Sarśapa meaning mustard. Saag derives from the Sanskrit Śāka meaning greens or vegetable leaves.

Ingredients and preparation
Mustard is widely grown in the region for the plant's leaves, seeds and seed oil. It is harvested in winter and spring, making sarson ka saag a popular warming dish in the cooler months.

There are many recipes for the dish, usually cooking the leaves in oil or clarified butter (ghee) with spices such as garlic, ginger and chilli. Other spices used vary according to region and taste.

Accompaniments
The dish is often served with bread such as Makki ki roti or Bajra ki roti.

See also 
 Palak paneer
 Saag

References

Further reading
 

Indian vegetable dishes
Indian cuisine
Pakistani curries
Punjabi cuisine